Percy Holman (5 April 1891 – 9 June 1978) was a British Labour and Co-operative politician.

Holman was educated at Mill Hill School and the London School of Economics. As e conscientious objector, he served in World War I with the Friends' Ambulance Unit and Red Cross in France, 1915–18. He took up a career as a paper merchant.

Holman was a councillor on Middlesex County Council 1928-31 and Teddington Urban District Council 1928–34. He stood as a candidate in Twickenham four times, at the 1931 general election, by-elections in 1932 and 1934 and the 1935 general election, without success. He was elected Member of Parliament for South West Bethnal Green in 1945 and for the redrawn Bethnal Green in 1950, serving until 1966.

Family
On 10 May 1918, he married Dorothy Mary Anderson (an Australian) who was a Labour member of the London County Council for twenty years. They had two daughters and a son.

References

External links 
 

1891 births
1978 deaths
British conscientious objectors
People associated with the Friends' Ambulance Unit
Labour Co-operative MPs for English constituencies
Councillors in Greater London
Alumni of the London School of Economics
UK MPs 1945–1950
UK MPs 1950–1951
UK MPs 1951–1955
UK MPs 1955–1959
UK MPs 1959–1964
UK MPs 1964–1966
People educated at Mill Hill School